Jiaxiang County is a county in the southwest of Shandong province, People's Republic of China. It is under the administration of Jining City.

The cultural heritage site of the Carved Stones in the Tombs of the Wu Family is in this county. In 1961, it was added to the list of national historical and cultural monuments. The county is also home to the temple of Zengzi, a Confucian disciple and philosopher. The Jining Qufu Airport is located in the southern part of the county.

Administrative divisions
As 2012, this county is divided to 8 towns and 7 townships.
Towns

Townships

Climate

References

External links 
 Official homepage

Counties of Shandong
Jining